Government Syed Hatem Ali College, located in Barisal, is one of the renowned colleges of southern Bangladesh. It is a university level college where students besides class 11 and 12, can attend into bachelor courses as well. Particularly, the higher secondary grade (class 11-12) students of this college are doing highest results every year than all the colleges in the southern region of Bangladesh.

History
The college was established in 1966 on 22 acres of land. It was donated by the famous social politician Lt. Syed Hatem Ali and this college was nationalized in 1986. His sons Syed Kawsar Hossain and Syed Asadul Hoq (Bachchu) also contributed a lot for the advancement of the institute in many ways over the years.

Academic departments
The college has 12 departments under 4 faculties for under graduate level. The faculties are:

Faculty of Arts
 Department of Bengali
 Department of English
 Department of History
 Department of Islamic Studies
 Department of Islamic History and Culture

Faculty of Business Studies
 Department of Accounting 
 Department of Marketing
 Department of Management Studies

Faculty of  Science
 Department of Zoology

Faculty of Social Sciences
 Department of Economics
 Department of Political Science
 Department of Social Work

See also
 Brojomohun College

External links
Official website

References

Colleges in Barisal District
Universities and colleges in Barisal District
Education in Barisal
1966 establishments in East Pakistan
Educational institutions established in 1966